Hirasea biconcava is a species of small air-breathing land snail, a terrestrial pulmonate gastropod mollusk in the family Endodontidae.

This is an endangered species.

Distribution
This species (and indeed the whole genus) is endemic to Japan.

References

Molluscs of Japan
Endodontidae
Gastropods described in 1907
Taxonomy articles created by Polbot